Cadaveria, real name Raffaella Rivarolo (born 31 May 1972), is an Italian musician famous for being one of the first women to enter the extreme metal scene in the early 1990s, as former vocalist and keyboard player of the symphonic black metal band Opera IX.

Biography
Cadaveria was born in Turin, Italy, on 31 May 1972. She would join the symphonic black metal band Opera IX in 1992, of which she served as the vocalist and keyboard player until 2001, when she left the band alongside bandmate Alberto "Flegias" Gaggiotti (also a member of extreme metal act Necrodeath) to form a new project.

In April 2001 Cadaveria and Flegias (using the pseudonym Marçelo Santos) founded the band CADAVERIA. The name of the band is written in all capital letters to distinguish it from the vocalist's name.
Shortly after, Killer Bob (bass), Frank Booth (guitar) and Baron Harkonnen (keyboards) joined the group. With the exception of Cadaveria herself, the pseudonyms of her band's members are taken from the names of antagonists from movies by American filmmaker David Lynch.

CADAVERIA's debut album, The Shadows' Madame, came out in 2002, released through Scarlet Records. It would be followed by 2004's Far Away from Conformity, also released by Scarlet Records. In 2007, the band signed up with Season of Mist and released the third full-length album, In Your Blood. The fourth album, Horror Metal, was announced in late 2010 and released in January 2012 through Bakerteam Records.

In 2011, Cadaveria provided additional vocals for Theatres des Vampires' song "Le Grand Guignol", off their album Moonlight Waltz. Marçelo Santos also worked with Theatres des Vampires in 2005, when he provided additional vocals for the track "Forever in Death", off their album Pleasure and Pain.

On 7 July 2014, Cadaveria announced that her band's fifth studio album, titled Silence, was on the works; it was released on 18 November 2014 through Scarlet Records. The album's first single, "Carnival of Doom", was released on 23 October 2014 via iTunes as a teaser. A music video for the track "Strangled Idols" was uploaded to Cadaveria's official YouTube channel on 30 June 2015.

On 2 September 2016, CADAVERIA released a split album alongside Necrodeath titled Mondoscuro, through Black Tears of Death Records.

Cadaveria is also the vocalist of the industrial metal band DyNAbyte.

In the summer of 2018, Cadaveria announced she had been diagnosed with breast cancer, and is currently ongoing treatment.

Discography

With Opera IX
 1992: Demo '92 (demo tape)
 1993: The Triumph of the Death (7-inch EP)
 1995: The Call of the Wood
 1998: Sacro Culto
 2000: The Black Opera: Symphoniæ Mysteriorum in Laudem Tenebrarum

With CADAVERIA
 2002: The Shadows' Madame
 2004: Far Away from Conformity
 2007: In Your Blood
 2012: Horror Metal
 2014: Silence
 2016: Mondoscuro (split with Necrodeath)
 2022: Emptiness

With DyNAbyte
 2004: Extreme Mental Piercing
 2010: 2KX

Band members

Current members
 Raffaella Rivarolo aka Cadaveria – vocals (2001–present) 
 Alberto Gaggiotti aka Marçelo Santos – drums (2001–present)
 Cristian Scarponi aka Dick Laurent – guitars (2009–present)
 Gianluca Fontana aka Peter Dayton – bass (2015–present)

Former members
 Davide Queirolo aka Killer Bob – bass (2001–2015)
 Stefano Tappari aka Frank Booth – guitars (2001–2016)
 LJ Dusk aka Baron Harkonnen – keyboards (2001–2003)

Timeline

References

External links
 
 Cadaveria on YouTube

1972 births
Italian women singer-songwriters
Italian singer-songwriters
Women heavy metal singers
Italian heavy metal musicians
Living people
English-language singers from Italy
Musicians from Turin
Season of Mist artists
Black metal singers
21st-century Italian singers
21st-century Italian women singers
Scarlet Records artists
Women in metal
Opera IX members